JWH-210 is an analgesic chemical from the naphthoylindole family, which acts as a potent cannabinoid agonist at both the CB1 and CB2 receptors, with Ki values of 0.46 nM at CB1 and 0.69 nM at CB2. It is one of the most potent 4-substituted naphthoyl derivatives in the naphthoylindole series, having a higher binding affinity (i.e. lower Ki) at CB1 than both its 4-methyl and 4-n-propyl homologues JWH-122 (CB1 Ki 0.69 nM) and JWH-182 (CB1 Ki 0.65 nM) respectively, and than the 4-methoxy compound JWH-081 (CB1 Ki 1.2 nM). It was discovered by and named after John W. Huffman.

JWH-210 may be neurotoxic to animals when administered in high doses.

Legal status
In the United States, all CB1 receptor agonists of the 3-(1-naphthoyl)indole class such as JWH-210 are Schedule I Controlled Substances.

JWH-210 and JWH-122 were banned in Sweden on 1 October 2010 as hazardous goods harmful to health, after being identified as ingredients in "herbal" synthetic cannabis products. The substances JWH-210, JWH-122 and JWH-203 were classified as illegal drugs by the Swedish government as of 1 September 2011.

As of October 2015 JWH-210 is a controlled substance in China.

See also 
JWH-081
JWH-193
JWH-398

References 

JWH cannabinoids
Naphthoylindoles
Designer drugs
CB1 receptor agonists
CB2 receptor agonists